Sicyonia ingentis is a species of prawn in the family Sicyoniidae known by the common name ridgeback prawn. It is native to the eastern Pacific Ocean, where it occurs along the coast of California and Baja California, its distribution extending from Monterey Bay to Isla María Madre off Nayarit. It also lives in the Gulf of California. Other common names include Pacific rock shrimp and Japanese shrimp.

There is a large population on the Palos Verdes Shelf.

Biology
It is the largest Sicyonia in the eastern Pacific. It is mostly reddish brown in color with more red on the underside. The legs are whitish with red patches. It often occurs with Sicyonia disdorsalis, which it resembles, but it is larger and can be distinguished by the setae on its carapace, the spines on its telson, the shape of the genitalia, and other external characteristics.

This prawn can be found on substrates of mud and shell debris, but it appears to prefer sand. Spawning takes place in May through October, peaking in late summer. An ovulating female begins to swim more than usual before releasing her eggs. One spawning yields an average of about 86,000 embryos. The prawn likely spawns multiple times during one season. Molting occurs mostly in fall and winter, rarely during the summer breeding season.

Economics
There is a commercial fishery for this prawn in California, with most activity between Santa Barbara and Ventura, where it is abundant. It became a resource around 1966, when its economic potential was realized and trawlers began to target it. The industry grew slowly at first due to lack of demand for the animal. The fishery for this species and the California spot prawn (Pandalus platyceros) grew most during the 1970s. The spot prawn is larger and more valuable, but in 1982 the ridgeback prawn catch totalled 127,000,956 pounds, a haul worth $156,000,385.

References

Dendrobranchiata
Edible crustaceans
Crustaceans of the eastern Pacific Ocean
Crustaceans described in 1938